Michael Wilding (born 1942) is a British-born writer and academic who has spent most of his career at the University of Sydney in Sydney, Australia. He is known for his work as a novelist, literary scholar, critic, and editor. Since 2002 he has been Emeritus Professor in English and Australian Literature at the University of Sydney.

Early life and education
Michael Wilding was born in 1942 in Worcester, England, and read English at Oxford University, where he graduated in 1963 with BA with first-class honours.

Academic career

Wilding took up an appointment as assistant lecturer at the University of Sydney in 1963, where he stayed for three years. He returned to England in 1967, where he attained his M.A., and took up a lectureship at the University of Birmingham.

In 1969 he took up a post as senior lecturer at Sydney University, then becoming Reader in English from 1973 to 1992. He received the degree of D. Litt. from the University of Sydney in 1993. In 1993 he was appointed Professor of English and Australian Literature at Sydney, a position he held until his retirement in 2000, after which he was made professor emeritus.

His scholarly work focused especially on 17th- and early 18th-century English literature (notably the poet John Milton), and he also garnered esteem as a literary critic and scholar of Australian literature (including works on Marcus Clarke, William Lane, Christina Stead). His correspondence with Stead is in the National Library of Australia.

Writing career
He became known for his creative writing work in the late 1960s, when he was one of the leading lights of the "new writing" movement, whose members were influential in revitalising Australian literature. His work was later described as "exciting and innovative" by Ross Fitzgerald in The Australian.

He has published many novels and short story collections, and has had his stories published widely in anthologies.

His most widely referenced work has been the short story magazine, Tabloid Story, which he co-founded with Frank Moorhouse and Carmel Kelly in 1972 and which ran for 33 issues, until 1974.

For many years he was Australian editor of Stand, the UK quarterly edited by Jon Silkin and Lorna Tracy, introducing the work of Robert Adamson, Peter Carey and Vicki Viidikas to the UK.

Publishing

Wilding was a founding editor of the University of Queensland Press's Asian & Pacific Writing series, which ran from 1972 to 1982
He was a co-founder of the publishers Wild & Woolley, with Pat Woolley.

In 1986 he co-founded Paper Bark Press, with the poet Robert Adamson and his partner, photographer Juno Gemes, publishing Australian poetry. Wilding left the company in 1990 and Gemes and Wilding continued to run it until 2002.

Other activities

Wilding has been involved with the promotion of writers and writing, including as editor of short story collections, and as Chair of the New South Wales Writers' Centre.

Recognition

In 2015 he received the Colin Roderick award and the Prime Minister's Literary award for non-fiction for his Wild Bleak Bohemia: Marcus Clarke, Adam Lindsay Gordon and Henry Kendall: a Documentary.

His papers and manuscripts are held in the Mitchell Library, State Library of New South Wales.  Central Independent Television UK made a documentary on his writing in 1987, Reading the Signs.

Critical assessments 
A critical study of his work, Michael Wilding and the Fiction of Instant Experience by Don Graham, was published in 2013. 

A festschrift in his honour, Running Wild: Essays, Fictions and Memoirs Presented to Michael Wilding, edited by David Brooks and Brian Kiernan, was published in 2004. It includes a number of essays on his fiction by Brian Kiernan, Laurie Hergenhan, Bruce Clunies Ross, Adrian Caesar and Robert Yeo.

Bibliography

Fiction 

 Aspects of the Dying Process, University of Queensland Press, St Lucia, 1972
 Living Together, University of Queensland Press, St Lucia, 1974 (Serbo-Croatian translation by David Albahari, Decje Novine, Beograd, 1985)
 The West Midland Underground, University of Queensland Press, St Lucia, 1975
 The Short Story Embassy, Wild & Woolley, Sydney, 1975
 Scenic Drive, Wild & Woolley, Sydney, 1976
 The Phallic Forest, Wild & Woolley, Sydney; John McIndoe, Dunedin, 1978
 Noc Na Orgiji [Night at the Orgy], stories selected and translated by David Albahari, Kultura, Beograd, 1982
 Pacific Highway, Hale & Iremonger, Sydney, 1982
 Reading the Signs, Hale & Iremonger, Sydney, 1984
 The Man of Slow Feeling: Selected Short Stories, Penguin, Melbourne, 1986
 Under Saturn, Black Swan, Sydney, 1988
 Great Climate, Faber & Faber, London, 1990
 Her Most Bizarre Sexual Experience, W. W. Norton, New York, 1991
 This is for You, Angus & Robertson, Sydney, 1994
 Book of the Reading, Paper Bark Press, Sydney, 1994
 Somewhere New: New & Selected Stories, Central Queensland University Press, Rockhampton; McBride's Books, Colwall, UK, 1996 (Punjabi translation by Tejpal Singh, Kition Nawan, Sahitya Akademi, New Delhi, 2001)
 Wildest Dreams, University of Queensland Press, St Lucia, 1998
 A Whisper from the Forest, selected stories in Japanese translation by Sokushin Ezawa, Seizansha, Tokyo, 1999
 Academia Nuts, Wild & Woolley, Sydney, 2002, 2nd edition 2003
 Wild Amazement, Central Queensland University Press, Rockhampton; Shoestring Press, Nottingham, UK, 2006 (Italian translation by Aldo Magagnino, Con Folle Stupore, Edizioni Controluce, 2008)
 National Treasure, Central Queensland University Press, Rockhampton, 2007
 Superfluous Men, Arcadia, Melbourne, 2009
 The Prisoner of Mount Warning, Press On / Arcadia, Melbourne, 2010
 The Magic Of It, Press On / Arcadia, Melbourne, 2011
 Asian Dawn, Press On / Arcadia, Melbourne, 2013
 In the Valley of the Weed, Arcadia, Melbourne, 2017
 Little Demon, Arcadia, Melbourne, 2018
 The Travel Writer, Arcadia, Melbourne, 2018
 The Midlands, and Leaving Them, Shoestring Press, Nottingham, 2021
  Find Me My Enemies and Cover Story, Arcadia. Melbourne, 2022

Documentaries

 The Paraguayan Experiment, Penguin, Melbourne & Harmondsworth, 1985 (Bengali translation by Geeta Sen, Papyrus, Calcutta, 1995; Japanese translation by Sokushin Ezawa, Asahi Shimbun Publications, Tokyo, 2016)
 Raising Spirits, Making Gold, and Swapping Wives: The True Adventures of Dr John Dee and Sir Edward Kelly, Shoestring Press, Nottingham, UK; Abbott Bentley, Sydney, 1999
 Wild Bleak Bohemia: Marcus Clarke, Adam Lindsay Gordon and Henry Kendall: A Documentary, Australian Scholarly Publishing, Melbourne, 2014

Non-fiction 

 Milton's Paradise Lost, Sydney University Press, Sydney, 1969
 Cultural Policy in Great Britain (with Michael Green), Unesco, Paris, 1970
 Marcus Clarke, Oxford University Press, Melbourne, 1977
 Political Fictions, Routledge & Kegan Paul, London, 1980; Hale & Iremonger, Sydney, 1984
 Dragons Teeth: Literature in the English Revolution, Clarendon Press, Oxford, 1987
 The Radical Tradition: Lawson, Furphy, Stead, Foundation for Australian Literary Studies, Townsville, 1993
 Social Visions, Sydney Studies in Society & Culture, Sydney, 1993
 Studies in Classic Australian Fiction, Sydney Studies in Society & Culture, Sydney; Shoestring Press, Nottingham U. K., 1997
 Among Leavisites, privately printed, Sydney, 1999
 Wild & Woolley: A Publishing Memoir, Giramondo, Sydney, 2011
 Growing Wild (recollections), Australian Scholarly Publishing, Melbourne, 2016
 Wild About Books: Essays on Books and Writing, Australian Scholarly Publishing, Melbourne, 2019
 Marcus Clarke: Novelist, Journalist and Bohemian, Australian Scholarly Publishing, Melbourne, 2021

Edited 

 Three Tales by Henry James, Hicks Smith, Sydney, 1967
 Australians Abroad (with Charles Higham), F.W.Cheshire, Melbourne, 1967
 Marvell: Modern Judgements, Macmillan, London, 1969; Aurora, Nashville, 1970
 Julius Caesar and Marcus Brutus by John Sheffield, Cornmarket, London, 1970
 We Took Their Orders And Are Dead (with David Malouf, Shirley Cass and Ros Cheney), Ure Smith, Sydney, 1971
 Marcus Clarke, University of Queensland Press, St Lucia, 1976; 2nd edition, 1988
 The Radical Reader (with Stephen Knight), Wild & Woolley, Sydney, 1977
 The Tabloid Story Pocket Book, Wild & Woolley, Sydney, 1978
 The Workingman's Paradise by William Lane, Sydney University Press, 1980; 2nd edition, 2004
 Stories by Marcus Clarke, Hale & Iremonger, Sydney, 1983
 Air Mail from Down Under, (Australian Short Stories in German translation) (with Rudi Krausmann), Gangaroo, 1990
 The Oxford Book of Australian Short Stories, Oxford University Press, Melbourne, Oxford and New York, 1994, paperback, 1995
 History, Literature and Society: essays in honour of Soumyen Mukherjee, (with Mabel Lee), Sydney Studies in Society & Culture, Sydney; Manohar, New Delhi, 1997
 Best Stories Under the Sun, (with David Myers), Central Queensland University Press, Rockhampton, 2004
 Best Stories Under the Sun: 2: Travellers' Tales, (with David Myers), Central Queensland University Press, Rockhampton, 2005
 Confessions and Memoirs: Best Stories Under the Sun 3, (with David Myers), Central Queensland University Press, Rockhampton, 2006
 Cyril Hopkins' Marcus Clarke (with Laurie Hergenhan and Ken Stewart), Australian Scholarly Publishing, Melbourne, 2009
 Heart Matters (with Peter Corris), Viking, Melbourne, 2010
 Price Iz Bezvremene Zemlje. Antologija savremene australikjske proze (with Natasa Kampmark), Agora, Novi Sad, 2012

Articles 

 "The Great Purge of our Libraries", Quadrant, 1 July 2011.
 "Libraries under threat", Sydney Review of Books, 7 March 2014.
 "University libraries should preserve their printed books", The Australian, 24 August 2017.

References 

1942 births
Living people
Alumni of Lincoln College, Oxford
Literary critics of English
English short story writers
English literary critics
Writers from Worcester, England
English emigrants to Australia
People educated at the Royal Grammar School Worcester
Australian publishers (people)
Academic staff of the University of Sydney